Giovanni d'Alemagna (born Johannes Alamanus; 9 July 1450) was a Venetian renaissance painter of German ancestry, active in Italy, with his brother-in-law Antonio Vivarini on religious paintings in Venice and Padua, that are preserved in the named cities together with those of Vivarini.

Biography
Giovanni d'Alemagna is remembered above all for the work done in Venice, characterized by decorative forms that recall Nordic influence. Between 1430 and 1435 he created a cycle called Stories of Christ, which are still exhibited at the Ca' d'Oro.

According to Ridolfo and Zanetti, Giovanni and Antonio Vivarini flourished about the year 1440, where they adduce authority for an altar-piece in San Pantalon, which bears the inscription of Zuane e Antonio da Muran pense 1444.

Although it is difficult to distinguish the two artists' contributions, Giovanni is associated with the St Jerome (1444), which carries the signature 'Johannes'. This painting suggests that Giovanni's work was generally flatter and more decorative than Antonio's more naturalistic style.

Giovanni d'Alemagna and Antonio Vivarini ran an shop in Venice that specialized in multi-tiered, multi-paneled altarpieces and fanciful Gothic frames, which they subcontracted to various woodworkers.

Giovanni and Antonio signed and dated the triptych representing the Enthroned Madonna with Child and Saints for the wall behind the officers' bench of the recently expanded meeting room of the Scuola della Carità (now part of the Gallerie dell'Accademia, a result of the collaboration made in 1446 for this room of the hotel. Resembling an altarpiece but functioning as an inducement to good decision making, this monumental painting shows the four doctors of the Church (Sts Gregory and Jerome at the left, Ambrose and Augustine at the right) in a courtyard around a massive Madonna and Child. The Virgin's celestial court is vividly rendered with marbled pink and grey architecture, rich deep colours, costly robes, and lovingly observed plant life.

In 1448, he worked at Vivarini's workshop, which was moved to Padua, together with Andrea Mantegna and Nicolò Pizolo, in the decoration of the Ovetari Chapel, but died soon afterwards.

 He was the tutor of Quirizio da Murano, the exact date is unknown today.

Works
 Triptych of Saint Jerome, Kunsthistorisches Museum, Vienna
 Decorations of the frescoes in the Ovetari chapel, Church of the Eremitani

In Venice

 Polyptych of the Body of Christ "or the Sepulcher", 1433, with Antonio Vivarini, Church of San Zaccaria, Chapel of San Tarasio, Venice
 Polyptych of Saint Sabina, 1443 and Polyptych of the Virgin with Antonio Vivarini, San Zaccaria Church, San Tarasio chapel
 Coronation of the Virgin, 1444 with Antonio Vivarini, Church of San Pantalon, Venice
 Triptych of the Virgin and child in majesty surrounded by angels between the doctors of the Church (saints Gregory, Jerome, Ambroise and Augustine, 1446, with Antonio Vivarini, tempera on panels, central 339cm × 200cm and two sides of 339cm × 138cm each, Gallerie dell'Accademia de Venise, Venice.

Notes

References

Bibliography

Further reading
 Ian Holgate, Artibus et Historiae, Vol. 24, No. 47 (2003), pp.929

External links

1411 births
1450 deaths
15th-century German painters
German male painters
15th-century Italian painters
Italian male painters
Year of birth uncertain